Tobi Neal Stoner (born December 3, 1984) is a former Major League Baseball pitcher who last played for the New York Mets.

Early life and education
Stoner was born in Landstuhl, Germany. He attended Garrett College in McHenry, Maryland to play junior college baseball and then played his last two years at Davis & Elkins College in Elkins, West Virginia, graduating in 2006. The Mets then drafted Stoner in the 16th round of the 2006 MLB draft.

Stoner, a 2002 graduate of Southern Garrett High School in Oakland Maryland, had his baseball jersey #13 retired by the school in 2010.

Baseball career
Stoner was called up to the Mets Major League club on September 8, 2009, and on April 18, 2010. He pitched in four games as a reliever for the Mets in 2009 and made one relief appearance in 2010.

References

External links

1984 births
Davis & Elkins Senators baseball players
Living people
Major League Baseball players from Germany
Major League Baseball pitchers
New York Mets players
Brooklyn Cyclones players
St. Lucie Mets players
Savannah Sand Gnats players
Binghamton Mets players
Buffalo Bisons (minor league) players
Bridgeport Bluefish players
Somerset Patriots players
Indios de Mayagüez players
Leones del Escogido players
American expatriate baseball players in the Dominican Republic
Peoria Saguaros players
People from Landstuhl
Sportspeople from Rhineland-Palatinate